AJR may refer to:

 AJR (motorcycle), Scotland
 AJR (band), a pop band from New York City, United States
Abdominojugular test, to measure venous pressure
 Academy for Jewish Religion (New York)
 American Journal of Roentgenology
 American Journalism Review
 Arvidsjaur Airport, Sweden, IATA code
 Association of Jewish Refugees, UK
 Allison Jones Rushing (born 1982), Judge on the United States Court of Appeals for the Fourth Circuit
 Axholme Joint Railway, former British railway company